Charles Konan Banny (11 November 1942 – 10 September 2021) was an Ivorian politician, who served as prime minister from 7 December 2005 until 4 April 2007.

Life and career
Banny joined the Central Bank of West African States (BCEAO) in 1976, holding various positions in the Bank over the years. In 1988 he became Special Advisor to the Governor of BCEAO. After BCEAO Governor Alassane Ouattara became Prime Minister of Côte d'Ivoire, Banny was appointed Interim Governor on 4 December 1990. On 22 December 1993, he was appointed Governor, formally taking the position on 1 January 1994. He was reappointed for another six-year term as Governor on 17 June 1999, with the term beginning on 1 January 2000.

Banny's selection to replace Seydou Diarra as transitional Prime Minister of Côte d'Ivoire was announced on 5 December 2005.  His term was expected to end in October 2006, when national elections were to be held; however, elections were not held by the deadline, and the term of President Laurent Gbagbo was extended for another year, with Banny's powers increased during that period.

Because of his selection as prime minister, Banny was barred from running for the office of President of Côte d'Ivoire. Following a peace deal in March 2007, New Forces leader Guillaume Soro was appointed Prime Minister at the end of the month, and he took over from Banny on 4 April.

Banny also held the position of Minister of Economy and Finance from December 2005 to April 2007.

In September 2021, Banny was evacuated to Europe for health reasons.

On 10 September 2021, Banny died in France of complications from COVID-19 following his evacuation. He was 78.

References

External links
 Report on Banny's naming as PM

1942 births
2021 deaths
Finance ministers of Ivory Coast
Heads of government of Ivory Coast
Ivorian bankers
Governors of the Central Bank of West African States
Ivorian economists
People from Divo, Ivory Coast
Deaths from the COVID-19 pandemic in France
21st-century Ivorian politicians